The 2017–18 Tunisian Ligue Professionnelle 2 (Tunisian Professional League) was the 63rd season since Tunisia's independence.

Teams

Group A

AS Ariana
AS Marsa
AS Kasserine
CS Korba
EGS Gafsa
ES Hammam-Sousse
Océano Club de Kerkennah
Sfax Railway Sports
Stir Sportive Zarzouna
US Tataouine

Group B

AS Djerba
AS Soliman
CS Hammam-Lif
CS Chebba
EO Sidi Bouzid
Jendouba Sport
Olympique Béja
Sporting Ben Arous
Stade Africain Menzel Bourguiba
Stade Sportif Sfaxien

Results

Group A

Table

Result table

Group B

Table

Result table

Playoffs

Promotion Playoffs

Promotion Playoffs table

Promotion Playoffs result table

Promotion playoff
This game was played between the 12th of Ligue 1 and the 3rd of Ligue 2.

Match stopped after 62 minutes because EGS Gafsa players left the pitch as a protest against the referee who was "clearly against them" and declared that they "couldn't play a football match in such conditions".

See also
2017–18 Tunisian Ligue Professionnelle 1
2017–18 Tunisian Cup

References

External links
 2017–18 Ligue 2 on RSSSF.com
 Fédération Tunisienne de Football

Tunisian Ligue Professionnelle 2 seasons